María Victoria Mayer (born ) is an Argentine volleyball player. She is part of the Argentina women's national volleyball team. She competed at the 2020 Summer Olympics.

Career 
She participated in the 2017 FIVB Volleyball Girls' U18 World Championship, and 2018 FIVB Volleyball Women's Nations League
 
At club level she played for Regatas - Santa Fe in 2018.

References

External links 
 FIVB profile

2001 births
Living people
Argentine women's volleyball players
Pan American Games medalists in volleyball
Pan American Games bronze medalists for Argentina
Volleyball players at the 2019 Pan American Games
Medalists at the 2019 Pan American Games
Volleyball players at the 2020 Summer Olympics
Olympic volleyball players of Argentina
Sportspeople from Santa Fe, Argentina
21st-century Argentine women